The 1954 Pittsburgh Panthers football team represented the University of Pittsburgh as an independent in the 1954 college football season. The Panthers lost their first three games of the season under third year head coach Red Dawson, before he stepped down due to poor health. Pittsburgh's athletic director, Tom Hamilton, appointed himself interim head coach and led the team to a 4–2 record over their final six games of the season. Pittsburgh finished the year with a record of 4–5.

Schedule

References

Pittsburgh Panthers
Pittsburgh Panthers football seasons
Pittsburgh Panthers football